The 1997 Wyoming Cowboys football team represented the University of Wyoming in the 1997 NCAA Division I-A football season. The Cowboys were led by first-year head coach Dana Dimel and played their home games at War Memorial Stadium in Laramie, Wyoming. They finished the season with a 7–6 record overall and a 4–4 record in the Western Athletic Conference to finish 4th in the Pacific Division.

Schedule

Game summaries

Ohio State

Iowa State

Hawai'i

San Jose State

Colorado

Montana

Nevada

Colorado State

SMU

San Diego State

UNLV

Air Force

Fresno State

References

Wyoming
Wyoming Cowboys football seasons
Wyoming Cowboys football